Janine Bowman (born March 15, 1973, in Woonsocket, Rhode Island) is an American sport shooter. She placed 24th in the women's 25 metre pistol event at the 2000 Summer Olympics.

References

1973 births
Living people
People from Woonsocket, Rhode Island
American female sport shooters
Olympic shooters of the United States
Shooters at the 2000 Summer Olympics
21st-century American women